Before You Know It may refer to:

 Before You Know It (software), a language acquisition software
 Before You Know It (2013 film), a 2013 documentary film
 Before You Know It (2019 film), a 2019 comedy film